The Cul De Sac River is a river in Castries Quarter of the island country of Saint Lucia. It flows north and then west from the central highlands in the south of the island, reaching the Caribbean Sea in Grand Cul de Sac Bay, south of the capital, Castries. It is one of the longest rivers in Saint Lucia.

See also
List of rivers of Saint Lucia

References

Rivers of Saint Lucia